Nawair Sports Club is a Syrian professional football club located in the city of Hama.

Current squad

Basketball department

League positions 
Syrian Basketball League
Fourth place (1): 2014
Fifth place (1): 2015 (Group B)
Seventh place (1): 2022
Eighth place (1): 2021
Syrian Basketball Cup
Third place (1): 2021

References

External links
  Official website

Nawair
1945 establishments in Mandatory Syria
Association football clubs established in 1945
Hama